Sappanol is a 3,4-dihydroxyhomoisoflavan, a type of homoisoflavonoid, that can be found in Caesalpinia sappan.

References 

Homoisoflavonoids